Anthidium gayi is a species of bee in the family Megachilidae, the leaf-cutter, carder, or mason bees.

Distribution
Argentina
Chile

Synonyms
Synonyms for this species include:
Anthidium coloratum Smith, 1854
Anthidium spinolae Gribodo, 1894

References

gayi
Insects described in 1851